McRae Williams (born October 23, 1990) is an American freestyle skier who competes internationally.
He competed for the United States at the FIS Freestyle Ski and Snowboarding World Championships 2017 in Sierra Nevada, Spain, where he won a gold medal in Slopestyle. McRae represented the United States in slopestyle at the 2018 Winter Olympics in PyeongChang, where he finished 15th.

During the summer, Williams can be found at Mt. Hood, Oregon, where he hosts a Takeover Session at Windells Camp.

References

External links
 
 
 
 
 

1990 births
Living people
American male freestyle skiers
Olympic freestyle skiers of the United States
Freestyle skiers at the 2018 Winter Olympics